Stanley Francis Palys (May 1, 1930 – February 8, 2021) was an American Major League Baseball outfielder. He was born in Blakely, Pennsylvania. He appeared in 138 games over all or parts of four seasons in the majors, from 1953 through 1956, for the Philadelphia Phillies and Cincinnati Redlegs.

Early life and education
Of Polish descent, Palys was born in a small town called Blakely, Pennsylvania on May 1, 1930. His parents, Genevieve and Francis, also gave birth to his three siblings, Mae, Henry, and Walter. Growing up, Palys was your average teenage kid. As one of the taller and more athletic kids at his school, Palys was interested in playing football for the Blakely Bears, the two-time undefeated champions of Eastern Pennsylvania at the time. However, Palys never ended up playing football in high school as his father, Francis, rejected the idea. Even after the coaches came to his house in desperation

With his main sport now baseball, Stan practiced every chance he got. As recalled by one of his five children, "Dad used to tell us he would go out to the coal banks and throw up small pieces of coal, hitting them with a broomstick for hours a day." He ended up being "local all-everything."

Professional baseball career

Philadelphia Phillies
Stan Palys would make his MLB baseball career in 1955 after the parent Philadelphia Phillies brought him up to play with their professional team. In a April 1963 article by Scranton Sports Secrets, a sports-related magazine located in Scranton, Pennsylvania. They write, "(Stan Palys) looked like one of the best in the National League... After 25 games, Stan was batting over 300 and was the talk of the league."

Cincinnati Redlegs
Of Polish descent, Palys signed with the Phillies before the 1950 professional baseball season and made his MLB debut in September 1953 after an All-Star campaign in the Class A Western International League. After another late-season audition in 1954, he made the majors for the full 1955 and 1956 campaigns. After starting 15 April games as a left fielder and right fielder for the 1955 Phillies and batting .288 with 15 hits, he was included in a six-player trade to Cincinnati on April 30 and became the Redlegs' semi-regular left fielder. He was plagued by injury, however, and batted only .230 for Cincinnati. The following year, 1956, saw the emergence of eventual Baseball Hall of Famer Frank Robinson, who took control of the Redlegs' left-field job and was voted National League Rookie of the Year. Palys played ten games in the outfield, 40 in all, and hit .226 in his last big-league season. He finished his MLB career with 79 hits, including 17 doubles, ten home runs and 38 runs batted in, batting .237 lifetime.

Palys continued to play in the minor leagues through 1963. He put up several seasons in the Double-A Southern Association, winning two batting titles (in 1957 and 1960). On July 7, 1963, while playing for the Triple-A Hawaii Islanders, Palys made the final out in a no-hitter thrown by Spokane Indians pitcher Bob Radovich. With two out in the ninth inning, an Islander player, Ron Samford, drew a walk. Palys came in to run for Samford. The next batter hit a grounder to first and Palys danced up and down until the ball hit him in the leg. Under baseball rules, a base hit is recorded for the batter and the baserunner declared out if the latter is struck by a ball in fair territory. Pacific Coast League president Dewey Soriano, who was in attendance that night, notified the press box that the final out was to be credited to the first baseman and that Palys' conduct constituted "unsportsmanlike play". (Apparently, no base hit was credited.)

Palys then completed his professional career with four seasons (1964–67) in Nippon Professional Baseball, belting 66 home runs in 446 total games, including 25 during 1965. He died on February 8, 2021, at the age of 90.

References

External links

1930 births
2021 deaths
American expatriate baseball players in Japan
American people of Polish descent
Baseball players from Pennsylvania
Birmingham Barons players
Carbondale Pioneers players
Charleston Senators players
Cincinnati Redlegs players
Corpus Christi Giants players
Hawaii Islanders players
Major League Baseball outfielders
Nashville Vols players
People from Lackawanna County, Pennsylvania
Philadelphia Phillies players
Schenectady Blue Jays players
Spokane Indians players
Syracuse Chiefs players
Terre Haute Phillies players
Tokyo Orions players